Eugenio Fascetti (born 23 October 1938 in Viareggio, Province of Lucca) is an Italian professional football coach and a former player, who played as a midfielder.

Honours

Player
Juventus
 Serie A champion: 1960–61.

Manager
 As a coach, won promotion to Serie A 5 times: 1984–85 (Lecce), 1987–88 (Lazio), 1989–90 (Torino), 1990–91 (Verona), 1996–97 (Bari).

External links

1938 births
Living people
People from Viareggio
Italian footballers
Serie A players
Serie B players
Bologna F.C. 1909 players
Juventus F.C. players
A.C.R. Messina players
S.S. Lazio players
Savona F.B.C. players
Calcio Lecco 1912 players
Italian football managers
U.S. Lecce managers
S.S. Lazio managers
U.S. Avellino 1912 managers
Torino F.C. managers
Hellas Verona F.C. managers
S.S.D. Lucchese 1905 managers
S.S.C. Bari managers
L.R. Vicenza managers
ACF Fiorentina managers
Como 1907 managers
Association football midfielders
Footballers from Tuscany
Sportspeople from the Province of Lucca